The Great Texas Dynamite Chase (also known as Dynamite Women) is a 1976 American crime comedy film  directed by Michael Pressman (in his directorial debut).

Plot
Busting out of prison, Candy Morgan (Claudia Jennings) gets out of her jumpsuit and robs a small Texas bank, with lighted sticks of dynamite. She is assisted by bank teller Ellie-Jo Turner (Jocelyn Jones), who has just been fired for persistent lateness and "total lack of character." Later, Candy picks up Ellie-Jo hitchhiking. The two tightly outfitted women decide to team-up and become a modern-day "Bonnie and Clyde" (or "Bonnie and Bonnie"). They meet Slim (Johnny Crawford) robbing a convenience store, and take him hostage. Knowing good gigs when he sees them, he makes the dynamite duo a threesome.

Cast

 Claudia Jennings as Candy Morgan
 Tara Strohmeier as Pam Morgan
 Jocelyn Jones as Ellie-Jo Turner
 Miles Watkins as Boyfriend
 Nancy Bleier as Carol
 Buddy Kling as Mr. Sherman
 Oliver Clark as Officer Andy
 Tom Rosqui as Jason Morgan
 Ed Steef as Todd
 Danny Sullivan as Young Texan
 Bart Braverman as Freddie
 Peggy Brenner as Bank Teller
 Jim Boles as Mr. Ralston
 Christopher Pennock as Jake
 Priscilla Pointer as Miss Harris
 Johnny Crawford as Slim

Reception
Variety called it "a good example of a well-made exploitation film which works on two levels, providing kicks for the ozoner crowd and tongue-in-cheek humor for the more sophisticated." Vincent Canby of The New York Times wrote, "Like every other low-budget, regional melodrama of this kind, the movie is virtually constructed of automobile chases in which every shot of the lead car turning a corner, hitting a bump or swerving to avoid a truck must be repeated by a shot of the pursuing car dealing with the same set of circumstances." Linda Gross of the Los Angeles Times stated, "Producer David Irving makes an auspicious first feature debut in this stylish and enjoyable fantasy about friendship among thieves."

References

External links

1976 films
1970s crime comedy films
American crime comedy films
1970s English-language films
Films about bank robbery
Films directed by Michael Pressman
Films scored by Craig Safan
1976 directorial debut films
1976 comedy films
1970s American films